Overtoomse Veld is a neighborhood of Amsterdam, Netherlands. It is named for the Overtoomse Sluis, which was an old portage point dating from the 14th century on a major cargo route to and from Amsterdam at the junction of two waterschap areas, Hoogheemraadschap van Rijnland and  Hoogheemraadschap van Amstelland.

In neighborhood Overtoomse Veld-Noord the following streets are named after Dutch painters from the 19th and 20th century:

 August Allebé
 Louis Apol
 Marius Bauer
 Antoon Derkinderen
 Jan Eisenloeffel
 Johan Greive
 Henk Henriët
 Johannes Hilverdink
 Theo van Hoytema
 Johan Jongkind
 Karel Klinkenberg
 Willem van Konijnenburg
 Chris Lebeau
 Charles Leickert
 Jan Mankes
 Wally Moes
 Piet Mondriaan
 Willem Nakken
 Ferdinand Hart Nibbrig
 Willem Nuijen
 Johan Thorn Prikker
 Suze Robertson
 Willem Roelofs
 Willy Sluiter
 Jan Sluijters
 Lawrence Alma-Tadema
 Jan Toorop
 Jan Veth
 Jan Voerman
 Anthonie Waldorp
 Hendrik Werkman

In neighborhood Overtoomse Veld-Midden the following streets are named after philosophers:
 Rudolf Carnap
 Gottlob Frege
 Gerrit Mannoury
 Ludwig Wittgenstein
 Wilhelmina of the Netherlands

For the Delflandpleinbuurt area in Overtoomse Veld-Zuid, the names come from places in Delfland:

 Abtswoude
 Delfland
 Hook of Holland (Hoek van Holland)
 Honselersdijk
 Kwintsheul
 De Lier
 Loosduinen
 Maassluis
 Naaldwijk
 Nootdorp
 Overschie
 Poeldijk
 Rijswijk
 Rodenrijs
 Schipluiden
 Vlaardingen
 Voorburg
 Westerlee

Amsterdam Nieuw-West
Neighbourhoods of Amsterdam